Thomas Walsh (12 February 1900 – 22 November 1950) was an English footballer who played as a centre forward.

Career
Thomas "Tot" Walsh scored 77 goals in reserve team matches during three seasons at Bolton Wanderers. He joined Bristol City in January 1924. During his time with the club he recorded the most League Goals in a match for Bristol City with 6 scored against Gillingham in a Division 3 South match on 15 January 15, 1927. He was also the club's top scorer in both the 1925–26 season (25) and 1926–27 season (32).

Walsh moved on to Crystal Palace in May 1928 before returning to Lancashire where he played two games for Mossley in the 1929–30 season. He died in 1950.

Honours
with Bristol City
Football League Third Division South winner: 1926–27

References

1900 births
1950 deaths
Footballers from Bolton
English footballers
Association football forwards
English Football League players
Bolton Wanderers F.C. players
Crystal Palace F.C. players
Bristol City F.C. players
Mossley A.F.C. players